Ernst Dietrich, of Ysenburg-Büdingen (30 August 1717 - 26 December 1758) was a German Count (Graf) from the House of Isenburg-Büdingen.

Early life and marriage 
Born on 30 August 1717, in Büdingen, the third child of Count Ernest Casimir I, of Ysenburg-Büdingen and Countess Christine Eleonore, of Stolberg-Gedern. Ernst married Princess Dorothea Wilhelmina Albertina, of Isenburg-Büdingen on 26 December 1758. Together the couple had three children.

 Christina Ernestina (26 June 1755 - 22 April 1756); died young.
 Ernst Casimir I (25–25 February 1801) married Eleanore Augusta Amalie, Countess von Bentheim-Steinfurt; had issue.
 Dorothea Luisa Carolina (14 September 1758 - 24 March 1784) never married; had no issue.

Ernst was 41 when he died on 26 December 1758, in Büdingen.

References 

1717 births
1758 deaths